Corbelli is an Italian surname. Notable people with the surname include:

 Alessandro Corbelli (born 1952), Italian baritone opera singer
 Guido Corbelli (1913–1994), Italian former professional footballer and manager
 Laurie Corbelli (born 1957), former professional indoor volleyball player
 Vito Corbelli (born 1941), former Sammarinese cyclist

Italian-language surnames